Loran may refer to:

 LORAN, a World War II radio-based navigation system, also known as Loran-A
 Loran-C, an improved navigation system that replaced the original LORAN
 Loran (death knight), a fictional character in the World of Greyhawk campaign setting for the Dungeons & Dragons role-playing game
 Loran, Iran, a village in Khuzestan Province, Iran
 Loran Award, an undergraduate scholarship in Canada
 Loran L. Lewis (1825–1916), New York judge and politician
 Loran Cehack, the fictional protagonist in the anime series Turn A Gundam
 First Maje Loran, the leader of the Kazon-Hobii from Star Trek: Voyager
 Loran (footballer), Brazilian footballer

See also
 Loren (name)
 Loren (disambiguation)